Lake Paracota (possibly from Aymara phara dry,  quta lake) is a lake in Peru located in the Puno Region, Puno Province, Pichacani District. Lake Paracota lies southeast of the larger Lake Jucumarini.

References 

Lakes of Peru
Lakes of Puno Region